Events in the year 2012 in South Korea.

Incumbents
 President – Lee Myung-bak (2008–2013)
 Prime Minister – Kim Hwang-sik (2010–2013)

Events

January
 The MOFAT Diamond Scandal is exposed.

February
 February 13 – The governing Grand National Party is renamed the Saenuri Party.

March
 March 8 – The South Korean military holds a live-fire land and air exercise near the North Korean border at Pocheon.
 March 12 – The South Korean government lodges a formal protest against Chinese claims to territorial jurisdiction over the Socotra Rock (Ieodo).
 March 15 – The South Korea–United States Free Trade Agreement comes into effect.
 March 22 – Korea National Oil Corporation announces a cut in imports of Iranian oil.
 March 23 – US President Barack Obama nominates Seoul-born Jim Yong Kim for the presidency of the World Bank.
 March 26–27 – The 2012 Nuclear Security Summit is held in Seoul, with over 55 leaders from around the world in attendance.
 March 29 – The Bank of Korea reports that with an easing global financial climate, South Korea returned to a current-account surplus in February.

April
 April 1 – The Blue House releases a statement alleging that over 80% of the cases brought to light in the South Korean illegal surveillance incident of 2010–12 took place under the previous administration of Roh Moo-hyun.
 April 11 – The 2012 legislative elections were held.

May
 May 2 –  At the COEX Intercontinental Hotel KeSPA, Ongamenet, Blizzard Entertainment and GomTV announced the introduction of StarCraft II to professional competitions in South Korea with the Brood War being completely phased out in October.
 May 12 – August 12 – The Expo 2012 took place.

June

July
 July 18 - Tropical Storm Khanun makes landfall over South Jeolla Province.

August

September
 September 17 - Typhoon Sanba made landfall on South Korea.

October
 October 7 — Due to an agreement with the U.S., South Korea has been allowed to develop ballistic missiles with a range of as much as 800 km.

December
 December 19 – The 2012 presidential elections were held.

Films

 49th Grand Bell Awards
 33rd Blue Dragon Film Awards
 17th Busan International Film Festival

Television

Music
 2012 in South Korean music
 List of number-one hits of 2012
 List of Gaon Album Chart number ones of 2012
 List of number-one Streaming Songs of 2012
 2012 Mnet Asian Music Awards

Sport
 2012 in South Korean football
 2012 Korean Grand Prix
 2012 Korea Professional Baseball season
 2012 South Korean Figure Skating Championships
 2012 Korea Open Super Series Premier
 2012 Korea Open Grand Prix Gold
 2012 Asia Series
 2012 Korean Series
 2012 Asian Tour
 2012 Asian Weightlifting Championships
 2012 Asian Wrestling Championships
 2012 Pacific-Asia Junior Curling Championships
 2012 World Wheelchair Curling Championship
 South Korea at the 2012 Summer Olympics
 South Korea at the 2012 Summer Paralympics
 South Korea at the 2012 Asian Beach Games
 South Korea at the 2012 Winter Youth Olympics

References

External links

 
2010s in South Korea